Acianthera fumioi is a species of orchid plant native to Peru.

References 

fumioi
Flora of Peru